Barry van Someren Thomas (born 1972) is a male former athlete who competed for England.

Athletics career
Thomas is a three times British champion in 1993, 1994 and 1996 after winning the British decathlon title.

He represented England in the decathlon event, at the 1998 Commonwealth Games in Kuala Lumpur, Malaysia. Four years later he represented England again at the 2002 Commonwealth Games.

References

1972 births
Living people
English male athletes
Athletes (track and field) at the 1998 Commonwealth Games
Athletes (track and field) at the 2002 Commonwealth Games
English decathletes
Commonwealth Games competitors for England